= Carversville Farm Foundation =

The Carversville Farm Foundation is an American non-profit foundation which manages the Carversville Farm, a 388 acres (157 ha) organic farm in Bucks County, Pennsylvania. The farm donates 90% of its produce and meat.

The farm is a member of the Pennsylvania Agricultural Surplus System, which helps to supply the Pennsylvania charitable food system.
